Chloropsina elegans is a species of fly in the family Chloropidae. It is found in the Philippines (Luzon).

References 

 Some type specimens of Philippine Diptera described by M. Bezzi in the Museo Civico di Storia Naturale, Milano
MD Delfinado - Pae. Insects, 1969

External links 
 Chloropsina elegans at insectoid.info

Chloropinae
Insects described in 1914
Arthropods of the Philippines
Diptera of Asia
Taxa named by Mario Bezzi